The Men's J. P. Morgan Tournament of Champions 2016 is the men's edition of the 2016 Tournament of Champions, which is a PSA World Series event (Prize money : 150 000 $). The event took place at the Grand Central Terminal in New York City in the United States from 7 January to 14 January. Mohamed El Shorbagy won his second Tournament of Champions trophy, beating Nick Matthew in the final.

Prize money and ranking points
For 2016, the prize purse was $150,000. The prize money and points breakdown is as follows:

Seeds

Draw and results

See also
2015–16 PSA World Series
2016 PSA World Tour
Women's Tournament of Champions 2016
Tournament of Champions (squash)

References

External links
PSA Tournament of Champions 2016 website
Tournament of Champions 2016 official website

Tournament of Champions
Tournament of Champions
2016 in sports in New York (state)
Tournament of Champions (squash)